Cerro Teotepec is a mountain summit located in the Mexican state of Guerrero. It is 3,550 meters high and is located in the Sierra Madre del Sur mountain range. It is located in the municipalities of Atoyac de Álvarez and General Heliodoro Castillo.

References

Landforms of Guerrero
Teotepec
Sierra Madre del Sur
North American 3000 m summits